Nicola Dalmazzo, O.S.A. or Nicola Dalmatico (died 20 April 1653) was a Roman Catholic prelate who served as Bishop of Fossano (1648–1653).

Biography
Nicola Dalmazzo was ordained a priest in the Order of Saint Augustine.
On 23 November 1648, he was appointed during the papacy of Pope Paul III as Bishop of Fossano. 
On 29 November 1648, he was consecrated bishop by Giovanni Battista Maria Pallotta, Cardinal-Priest of San Silvestro in Capite, with Ranuccio Scotti Douglas, Bishop of Borgo San Donnino, and Patrizio Donati, Bishop Emeritus of Minori, serving as co-consecrators. 
He served as Bishop of Fossano until his death on 20 April 1653.

See also
Catholic Church in Italy

References

External links and additional sources
 (for Chronology of Bishops) 
 (for Chronology of Bishops) 

17th-century Italian Roman Catholic bishops
Bishops appointed by Pope Paul III
1653 deaths